Manuel "Manu" García Alonso (born 2 January 1998) is a Spanish footballer who plays as an attacking midfielder for Super League Greece club Aris. He also represents the Spain national team.

Club career

Early career
Born in Oviedo, Asturias, García joined Sporting de Gijón's youth setup in 2010, aged 12, from Astur CF. On 2 May 2013 he agreed to a move to Manchester City, which paid €250,000 for his services in January, shortly after his 16th birthday.

Manchester City
García was initially assigned to the club's under-18 squad. In May 2015, shortly after being promoted to the under-21s, he was called up to the main squad by manager Manuel Pellegrini ahead of the year's North America pre-season tour.

On 27 May 2015 García made his senior debut for City, coming on as a late substitute for David Silva in a 1–0 friendly away win against Toronto FC. He also took part of the club's pre-season friendlies against Melbourne City, Roma, Vietnam and Stuttgart.

García made his professional debut on 22 September 2015, coming on as a 74th-minute substitute for Sergio Agüero in a 4–1 Football League Cup away routing of Sunderland. He went on to score the fifth goal in the 5–1 victory against Crystal Palace in the same competition. He made his Premier League debut against Aston Villa on 5 March 2016, replacing Yaya Touré.

On 1 December 2016, García signed a contract extension with Manchester City, keeping him with the club until June 2020.

Alavés (loan)
On 16 August 2016, García was loaned to Deportivo Alavés, newly promoted to La Liga, for one year. He only made his debut on 1 December, as a substitute in a 3–0 win over Gimnàstic de Tarragona in the Copa del Rey.

NAC Breda (loan)
On 9 January 2017, García ended his season long loan short with Alavés and spent the rest of the season with Eerste Divisie side NAC Breda. He made his debut immediately, starting in a 2–0 win over Jong FC Utrecht on 16 January. García scored his first goal for the club on 6 February in a 1–0 win over Dordrecht.

García was loaned back to NAC Breda for the 2017–18 season on 30 June 2017.

Toulouse (loan)
García joined Toulouse on loan for the 2018–19 season.

Sporting Gijón
García rejoined his first club Sporting de Gijón on 19 July 2019, signing a five-year contract and becoming the highest transfer in the club's history, as they paid €4 million for his services.

Return to Alavés (loan)
On 8 July 2021, García returned to Alavés, again in the top tier, also on loan.

Aris
On 24 July 2022, Manu signed a four-year contract with Aris for a club record fee of €4,000,000. He scored his first goal in a 3–0 home win against Asteras Tripoli, on 8 January 2023.

On 21 January 2023, the young Spanish midfielder scored his first career hat-trick in a comfortable 3–0 home win against Volos.

International career
Due to the isolation of some national team players following the positive COVID-19 test of Sergio Busquets, Spain's under-21 squad were called up for the international friendly against Lithuania on 8 June 2021. García made his senior debut in the match as Spain won 4–0.

Career statistics

Club

International

Notes

References

External links
 Manchester City profile
 
 
 
 
 

1998 births
Living people
Footballers from Oviedo
Spanish footballers
Association football midfielders
La Liga players
Segunda División players
Deportivo Alavés players
Sporting de Gijón players
Premier League players
Manchester City F.C. players
Eredivisie players
Eerste Divisie players
NAC Breda players
Ligue 1 players
Toulouse FC players
Aris Thessaloniki F.C. players
Super League Greece players
Spain youth international footballers
Spain under-21 international footballers
Spain international footballers
Spanish expatriate footballers
Spanish expatriate sportspeople in England
Spanish expatriate sportspeople in France
Spanish expatriate sportspeople in the Netherlands
Spanish expatriate sportspeople in Greece
Expatriate footballers in England
Expatriate footballers in France
Expatriate footballers in Greece
Expatriate footballers in the Netherlands